Argonaut Games PLC was a British video game developer founded in 1982, most notable for the development of the Super NES video game Star Fox and its supporting Super FX hardware, as well as for developing Croc: Legend of the Gobbos and the Starglider series. The company was liquidated in late 2004, and ceased to exist in early 2007.

History 

Founded as Argonaut Software by teenager Jez San in 1982, the company name is a play on his name (J. San) and the mythological story of Jason and the Argonauts.

Its head offices were in Colindale, London, and later in the Argonaut House in Edgware, London. Its U.S. head office was in Woodside, California in the San Francisco Bay Area.

In 1990, Argonaut collaborated with Nintendo during the early years of the NES and SNES, a notable incident being when Argonaut submitted a proof-of-concept method of defeating the Game Boy's copyright protection mechanism to Nintendo. The combined efforts from both Nintendo and Argonaut yielded a prototype of the game Star Fox, initially codenamed "SnesGlider" and inspired by their earlier Atari ST and Amiga game Starglider, that they had running on the NES and then some weeks later on a prototype SNES. Jez San told Nintendo that his team could only improve performance or functionality of the demonstration if Nintendo allowed Argonaut to design custom hardware to extend the SNES to have true 3D capability. Nintendo agreed, so San hired chip designers and made the Super FX chip. They originally codenamed it the Mathematical Argonaut Rotation I/O, or "MARIO", as is printed on the chip's surface. So powerful was the Super FX chip used to create the graphics and gameplay, that they joked that the Super NES was just a box to hold the chip.

After building the Super FX, Argonaut designed several different chips for other companies' video game machines, which were never released. These include machines codenamed GreenPiece and CD-I 2 for Philips, the platform codenamed VeggieMagic for Apple and Toshiba, and Hasbro's "virtual reality" game system codenamed MatriArc.

In 1995, Argonaut Software was split into Argonaut Technologies Limited (ATL) and Argonaut Software Limited (ASL). With space being a premium at the office on Colindale Avenue, ATL was relocated to an office in the top floor of a separate building. The building was called Capitol House on Capitol Way, just around the corner. There, they continued the design of CPU and GPU products and maintained "BRender", Argonaut's proprietary software 3D engine. They won a chip design project with LSI Logic for a potential PlayStation 2 design. LSI Logic became a minor investor in Argonaut.

In 1996, John Edelson was hired as the company General Manager. John Edelson ran the group for two years. Capital was raised in 1996–1998 from Tom Teichman and Apax Partners. According to Jez San, Argonaut remained an independent developer by choice, and had turned down several buyout offers.

In 1997, the two arms of the company once again shared an office as the entire company was moved to a new building in Edgware. In September 1997, Croc: Legend of the Gobbos was released by Fox Interactive for the PlayStation and Sega Saturn. A PC version of the game was also later released in 1998.

In 1998, ATL was rebranded ARC after the name of their main product, the Argonaut RISC Core, and became an independent company spun off to the same shareholders. ARC was an embedded IP provider. Bob Terwilliger was engaged as the President.

Argonaut Software Limited became Argonaut Games and was floated in 1999.

In late October 2004, Argonaut Games called in receivers David Rubin & Partners, laid off 100 employees, and was put up for sale. Many former employees would join newly established developer Rocksteady Studios. A lack of a consistent stream of publishing deals had led to cash-flow issues and a profit warning earlier that year. In 2005, the company entered liquidation and was dissolved in early 2007.

BRender 
BRender (abbreviation of "Blazing Renderer") is a development toolkit and a realtime 3D graphics engine for computer games, simulators, and graphic tools. It was developed and licensed by Argonaut Software. The engine had support for Intel's MMX instruction set and it supported Microsoft Windows, MS-DOS and PlayStation platforms. Support for 3D hardware graphics accelerator cards was added. Software made with BRender includes Carmageddon, Croc: Legend of the Gobbos, FX Fighter, I-War, and 3D Movie Maker. It was released as free and open-source software under the MIT License on May 3, 2022.

Games developed

Cancelled games

References

External links 
 

Defunct video game companies of the United Kingdom
Defunct companies based in London
Video game companies established in 1982
Video game companies disestablished in 2004
Video game development companies
1982 establishments in England
2004 disestablishments in England
Star Fox